Selenarctia elissa is a moth in the family Erebidae. It was described by William Schaus in 1892. It is found in French Guiana, Suriname, Guyana, Brazil, Venezuela, Colombia, Ecuador, Peru and Bolivia.

References

Moths described in 1892
Phaegopterina
Arctiinae of South America